Electrical bonding is the practice of intentionally electrically connecting all exposed metal items not designed to carry electricity in a room or building  as protection from electric shock. If a failure of electrical insulation occurs, all bonded metal objects in the room will have substantially the same electrical potential, so that an occupant of the room cannot touch two objects with significantly different potentials. Even if the connection to a distant earth is lost, the occupant will be protected from dangerous potential differences.

Explanation
In a building with electricity, it is normal for safety reasons to connect all metal objects such as pipes together to the mains earth to form an equipotential zone. This is done in the UK because many buildings are supplied with a TN−C−S earthing system where the neutral and earth conductors are combined. Close to the electricity meter this conductor is divided into two, the earth and the neutral busbar in the consumer unit. If the ground connection to the neutral is lost, all wiring and other objects tied to the neutral will be energized at the line voltage. Examples of articles that may be bonded include metallic water piping systems, gas piping, ducts for central heating and air conditioning systems, and exposed metal parts of buildings such as handrails, stairs, ladders, platforms, and floors. 
A person touching the un-earthed metal casing of an electrical device, while also in contact with a metal object connected to remote earth, is exposed to an electric shock hazard if the device has a fault. If all metal objects are connected, all the metal objects in the building will be at the same potential. It then will not be possible to get a shock by touching two 'earthed' objects at once.

Bonding is particularly important for bathrooms, swimming pools, and fountains. In pools and fountains, any metal object (other than conductors of the power circuit) over a certain size must be bonded to assure that all conductors are at the same potential.  Since it is buried in the ground, a pool can be a better ground than the electric panel ground. With all the conducting elements bonded, it is less likely that an electric current will find a path through a swimmer. In concrete pools, even the reinforcing bars of the concrete must be connected to the bonding system to ensure no dangerous potential gradients are produced during a fault.

How the earth protects

In a system with a grounded (earthed) neutral, connecting all non-current-carrying metal parts of equipment to earth ground at the main service panel will ensure that current due to faults (such as a "hot" wire touching the frame or chassis of the device) will be diverted to earth. In a TN system where there is a direct connection from the installation earth to the transformer neutral, earthing will allow the branch circuit over-current protection (a fuse or circuit breaker) to detect the fault rapidly and interrupt the circuit. 
 
In the case of a TT system where the impedance is high due to the lack of direct connection to the transformer neutral, an RCD must be used to provide disconnection. RCDs are also used in other situations where rapid disconnection of small earth faults (including a human touching a live wire by accident, or damage) is desired.

Equipotential bonding
Equipotential bonding involves electrically connecting metalwork so that it is at the same voltage everywhere.  Exact rules for electrical installations vary by country, locality, or supplying power company.
 
Equipotential bonding is done from where the distribution wiring enters the building to incoming water and gas services. It is also done in bathrooms where all exposed metal that leaves the bathroom including metal pipes and the earths of electrical circuits must be bonded together to ensure that they are always at the same potential. Isolated metal objects, including metal fittings fed by plastic pipe, are not required to be bonded with the exception of construction utilizing metal stud work and framing seen in many taller condominium, apartment, and office/commercial  construction.

Aircraft electrical bonding
In aircraft, electrical bonding prevents static electricity build-up that can interfere with radio and navigational equipment. Bonding also provides lightning protection by allowing the current to pass through the airframe with minimum arcing. Bonding prevents dangerous static discharges in aircraft fuel tanks and hoses.

See also
 Earthing system
 Earth potential rise
 Stray voltage
 Bonding jumper

Notes and references
Aircraft hose electrical bonding

Electric power distribution
Electrical safety

et:Maandamine#Potentsiaalühtluse süsteem